The 1914 Pyrenees Cup was the 5th and last tournament of the Pyrenees Cup, one of the first international football club competitions. The competition was held on the road between 1 March and 24 May, and it was won by FC Espanya de Barcelona after beating La Comète et Simiot 3–1 in the final. This was the first time a team other than FC Barcelona won the competition, being finally knocked out by the eventual champions in the semi-finals in an unexpected 2–5 loss.

Participants
The tournament was contested by 7 teams, three from Barcelona, two from Midi-Pyrénées and one each from Côte d'Argent and Sabedell, the latter making their debut in the competition.

Tournament

Results

Quarter-finals

Semi-final

After the final, there were serious incidents and field invasion. Molins attacked Salvó I, giving him a punch that left him unconscious.

Final

Statistics

Top Scorers

See also
 1895 World Championship
 1900 Coupe Van der Straeten Ponthoz
 1909 Sir Thomas Lipton Trophy

References

Copa Catalunya seasons
1913–14 in European football
Defunct international club association football competitions in Europe
1913–14 in Spanish football
1913–14 in French football